Barclay Henley (March 17, 1843 – February 15, 1914) was an attorney and politician who served two terms as United States Representative from California from 1883 to 1887.

Biography
Henley was born in Charlestown, Indiana, and was the son of Thomas J. Henley. He moved with his parents to San Francisco, California in 1853 and returned to Indiana in 1858 to attend Hanover College. He returned to San Francisco in 1861 and studied law. He was admitted to the bar in 1864 and commenced practice in Santa Rosa, California.

Henley was a member of the State assembly in 1869 and 1870. He was the district attorney of Sonoma County in 1875 and 1876. He was elected as a Democrat to the Forty-eighth and Forty-ninth Congresses (March 4, 1883 -March 3, 1887). He again settled in San Francisco and continued the practice of law until his death in that city in 1914. His remains were cremated and the ashes interred in the Santa Rosa Cemetery, Santa Rosa, California.

References

1843 births
1914 deaths
Democratic Party members of the United States House of Representatives from California
Politicians from San Francisco
People from Charlestown, Indiana
Hanover College alumni
People from Santa Rosa, California
19th-century American politicians